Friedrich Stolz (6 April 1860 – 2 April 1936) was a German chemist and, in 1904, the first person to artificially synthesize epinephrine (adrenaline).

References
 

1860 births
1936 deaths
19th-century German chemists
20th-century German chemists